The list of ship launches in 1710 includes a chronological list of some ships launched in 1710.


References

1710
Ship launches